Melstaður Deanery (Icelandic: Melstaðarprestakall) is a deanery within Húnavatns Deanery in Miðfjörður. In it are five parishes: Melstaðar parish, Prestbakka parish, Staðarbakka parish, Staðar parish and Víðidalstungu parish. The current priest in Melstaður deanery since 1982 is Guðni Þór Ólafsson.

Church of Iceland